The arrondissement of L'Haÿ-les-Roses is an arrondissement of France in the Val-de-Marne department in the Île-de-France region. It has 18 communes.

Composition

The communes of the arrondissement of L'Haÿ-les-Roses, and their INSEE codes, are:

 Ablon-sur-Seine (94001)
 Arcueil (94003)
 Cachan (94016)
 Chevilly-Larue (94021)
 Choisy-le-Roi (94022)
 Fresnes (94034)
 Gentilly (94037)
 L'Haÿ-les-Roses (94038)
 Ivry-sur-Seine (94041)
 Le Kremlin-Bicêtre (94043)
 Orly (94054)
 Rungis (94065)
 Thiais (94073)
 Valenton (94074)
 Villejuif (94076)
 Villeneuve-le-Roi (94077)
 Villeneuve-Saint-Georges (94078)
 Vitry-sur-Seine (94081)

History

The arrondissement of L'Haÿ-les-Roses was created in January 1973. On 25 February 2017, it gained 8 communes from the arrondissement of Créteil.

As a result of the reorganisation of the cantons of France which came into effect in 2015, the borders of the cantons are no longer related to the borders of the arrondissements. The cantons of the arrondissement of Créteil were, as of January 2015:

 Arcueil
 Cachan
 Chevilly-Larue
 Fresnes
 L'Haÿ-les-Roses
 Le Kremlin-Bicêtre
 Thiais
 Villejuif-Est
 Villejuif-Ouest

Sub-prefects 
 Pierre-Henry Maccioni : on 9 March 1990
 Hugues Bousiges : 1996-1998

References

L'Hay-les-Roses